Metaplatybunus is a genus of harvestmen in the family Phalangiidae.

Species
 Metaplatybunus carneluttii Hadzi, 1973
 Metaplatybunus creticus Roewer, 1923
 Metaplatybunus filipes Roewer, 1956
 Metaplatybunus grandissimus (C.L.Koch, 1839)
 Metaplatybunus petrophilus Martens, 1965
 Metaplatybunus pictus Mkheidze, 1952
 Metaplatybunus rhodiensis Roewer, 1924
 Metaplatybunus salfi Lerma, 1952

References

Harvestmen
Harvestman genera